Zygottus is a genus of American sheet weavers that was first described by Ralph Vary Chamberlin in 1949.

Species
 it contains only two species: 
Zygottus corvallis Chamberlin, 1949 – USA
 Zygottus oregonus Chamberlin, 1949 – USA

See also
 List of Linyphiidae species (Q–Z)

References

Araneomorphae genera
Linyphiidae
Spiders of the United States